Suzanne Blais is a Canadian politician, an auxiliary nurse by training and a businesswoman, who was elected to the National Assembly of Quebec in the 2018 provincial election. She represents the electoral district of Abitibi-Ouest as a member of the Coalition Avenir Québec.

References

Living people
Coalition Avenir Québec MNAs
21st-century Canadian politicians
People from Abitibi-Témiscamingue
Women MNAs in Quebec
Year of birth missing (living people)
21st-century Canadian women politicians